Ian Reginald Thompson (born 16 October 1949) is an English long-distance runner, who gained success in marathon running. His Commonwealth Games marathon record set in 1974 remains unbeaten.

Running career

Making up the numbers
Born in the town of Birkenhead, Cheshire (now Merseyside), Ian Thompson was regarded as just an ordinary club athlete and ranked 90th in Britain's 5,000 metres list at the time, but suddenly broke through to world class as a marathon runner when asked to make up the numbers for his club, Luton United, in the Amateur Athletic Association of England (AAA) marathon championship on 27 October 1973. It was his first race of over 10 miles, but he won in 2:12:40, at the time, the fastest ever debut at the distance and qualified him for the Commonwealth Games three months later

Commonwealth gold
Thompson travelled to Christchurch for the 1974 British Commonwealth Games with little expectation that he would be able to reproduce the performance that got him there.  This was not the case however and he won with a margin of over 2 minutes in a time of 2:09:12, the fastest ever run in a championship race, a British record and only 39 seconds off the then world record of 2:08:34.  This is currently (19 September 2020) the eighth fastest time by a British athlete (according to runbritainrankings.com) and still a Commonwealth Games record.

European gold
In the early autumn of 1974, Thompson competed at the European Championships in Rome, again he proved to be the class act of the field.  He stayed with the leading group until the 20 kilometre mark and then steadily opening up a gap on the rest of the field that stood at 98 seconds when he won in a time of 2:13:18.8.

Thompson's achievements were recognised in the 1974 SJA Annual Sports awards, where he was runner up to John Conteh in the Sportsmen of the Year category.

Olympics
In 1976, he suffered cramps and finished only seventh in the trials for the Olympics, for which he was not selected. Although for many years among Britain's best, he never regained his 1974 eminence and contested only one more major championship. He won the AAA title in 1980 to gain selection for the Moscow Olympics but dropped out at the Games.  His best times each year between 1977 and 1982 were in the 2:12 to 2:15 range.

Personal life
His wife Margaret was an early pioneer of marathon running for women in Britain and ran a British best time of 3:07:47 in Korso, Finland on 26 October 1975 and for a few months they held both the men and women's British marathon records, until Margaret's time was beaten by Christine Readdy (Kilkenny) in Feltham on 4 April 1976. Margaret (nee Tunstall) trained at Bedford College of Physical Education. At the time of his victory at the Commonwealth Games Thompson was studying for a PGCE at Trinity and All Saints College (TASC).

Thompson was famously quoted at his 1974 peak as saying "I prefer to remain in blissful ignorance of the opposition. That way I'm not frightened by anyone's reputation".

Personal Bests

Competitions

Notes

References

External links
 BritishAthletics.info – Biography Page
Photograph – 1974 European Championships

1949 births
Living people
Sportspeople from Birkenhead
English male marathon runners
Olympic athletes of Great Britain
Athletes (track and field) at the 1980 Summer Olympics
Commonwealth Games medallists in athletics
Commonwealth Games gold medallists for England
Athletes (track and field) at the 1974 British Commonwealth Games
European Athletics Championships medalists
Paris Marathon male winners
Alumni of Leeds Trinity University
Medallists at the 1974 British Commonwealth Games